Raymond John Potter (7 May 1936 – 7 August 2005) was an English footballer who played for Crystal Palace, Portsmouth and West Bromwich Albion.

References

1936 births
2005 deaths
English footballers
Association football goalkeepers
English Football League players
Millwall F.C. players
Beckenham Town F.C. players
Crystal Palace F.C. players
West Bromwich Albion F.C. players
Portsmouth F.C. players